Air Chief Marshal Sir Theodore Neuman McEvoy,  (21 November 1904 – 19 September 1991) was a senior Royal Air Force officer  who held high command in the 1950s and early 1960s. His last appointment was as Air Secretary.

RAF career
McEvoy joined the Royal Air Force (RAF) as a cadet in 1923. He became Officer Commanding No. 1 Squadron in 1935 and served in the Second World War as Station Commander at RAF Northolt, before moving on to be Group Captain – Operations at Headquarters RAF Fighter Command in December 1941. This was followed by appointments as Senior Air Staff Officer, first at No. 11 Group, then at Desert Air Force, and finally at No. 84 Group. In 1945 he was appointed Director of Staff Duties at the Air Ministry.

After the war McEvoy was appointed Air Officer Commanding No. 61 Group in 1949 and then from 1950 he was Assistant Chief of the Air Staff (Training) at the Air Ministry. He went on to be RAF Instructor at the Imperial Defence College from 1954, Chief of Staff at Headquarters Allied Air Forces Central Europe from 1956 and Air Secretary from 1959 before retiring in 1962.

Later life
In retirement, McEvoy became Chairman of the Society for Italic Handwriting.

References

External links
 Imperial War Museum Interview

 

1904 births
1991 deaths
Commanders of the Order of the British Empire
Commanders of the Order of Polonia Restituta
Knights Commander of the Order of the Bath
Royal Air Force air marshals
Royal Air Force personnel of World War II